Nepal, officially the Federal Democratic Republic of Nepal, is a landlocked sovereign state located in South Asia between two countries; China by the north and India by the east, west and south. The national symbols of Nepal according to the New Constitutions of Nepal 2072 are:

Bird

The Himalayan monal (Lophophorus impejanus) also known as the impeyan monal, impeyan pheasant or danfe is a bird of the genus Lophophorus of the pheasant family, Phasianidae. It is the national bird of Nepal, where it is known as the danfe in Nepali. It gives 4 to 6 eggs at time after 27 days of conception. It is found in himalayan region where small bushes and rhododendron is available.

Emblem

The emblem of Nepal was changed during the reconciliation period following the Nepalese Civil War. On 30 December 2006, a new coat of arms was introduced. It contains the flag of Nepal, Mount Everest, green hills symbolising the hilly regions of Nepal and yellow colour symbolising the fertile Terai region, male and female hands joining to symbolise gender equality, and a garland of rhododendrons (the national flower). Atop this is a white silhouette in the shape of Nepal. In 2020, a new revised coat of arms was introduced.

Flag

The national flag of Nepal is the world's only non-quadrilateral national flag. The flag is a simplified combination of two single pennons, the vexillological word for a pennant. Its crimson red is the colour of the rhododendron, the country's national flower. Red is also the sign of victory in war. The blue border is the colour of peace. Until 1962, the flag's emblems, the sun and the crescent moon, had human faces. They were removed to modernize the flag.

Dress

Daura-Suruwal, gunyo cholo are popular dresses. But officially Nepal doesn't possess any specific dress as national dress. Previously Daura-Suruwal for men and Gunyo-Cholo for women were considered national dress.

National Anthem

Animal

Cow is the national animal of Nepal. Cattle (colloquially cows) are the most common type of large domesticated ungulates. They are a prominent modern member of the subfamily Bovinae, are the most widespread species of the genus Bos, and are most commonly classified collectively as Bos primigenius. Cows are not raised as livestock for meat (beef and veal), but as dairy animals for milk and other dairy products, and as draft animals (oxen or bullocks) (pulling carts, plows and the like). The national breed Achham cattle which falls in the Bos indicus species is understood to be the national animal.

Flower

Rhododendron (lali gurans) is a genus of over 1000 species of woody plants in the heath family, either evergreen or deciduous. Rhododendron are found in the altitude range from 1200 meters to 3600 meters above the sea level.

Language

The official language of Nepal is Nepali language. Nepali or Nepalese is a language in the Indo-Aryan branch of the Indo-European language family. It is the official language and de facto lingua franca of Nepal and is also spoken in Bhutan and parts of India. In India, it is one of the country's 2nd official languages: Nepali has official language status in the formerly independent state of Sikkim and in West Bengal's Darjeeling district. Nepali developed in proximity to a number of Tibeto-Burman languages, most notably Kirati and Gurung, and shows Tibeto-Burman influences

Color
Crimson is a strong, bright, deep reddish purple color. it is the national colour of Nepal.

Sport 
Volleyball is the national sport of Nepal. Previously, dandi biyo, a stick game was considered to be de facto national game. However, in 2017, the government of Nepal announced volleyball as the national sport.

References